Little Miss Nobody is a 1936 American drama film directed by John G. Blystone and written by Lou Breslow, Paul Burger and Edward Eliscu. The film stars Jane Withers, Jane Darwell, Ralph Morgan, Sara Haden, Harry Carey and Betty Jean Hainey. The film was released on June 5, 1936, by 20th Century Fox. The story had previously been filmed in 1929 as Blue Skies.

Plot

Cast  
Jane Withers as Judy Devlin
Jane Darwell as Martha Bradley
Ralph Morgan as Gerald Dexter
Sara Haden as Teresa Lewis
Harry Carey as John Russell
Betty Jean Hainey as Mary Dorsey
Thomas E. Jackson as Dutch Miller
Jackie Morrow as Junior Smythe
Jed Prouty as Hector Smythe
Claudia Coleman as Sybil Smythe
Donald Haines as Harold Slade
Clarence Wilson as Herman Slade
Lillian Harmer as Jessica Taggert

References

External links 
 
 

1936 films
American drama films
1936 drama films
20th Century Fox films
Films directed by John G. Blystone
American black-and-white films
Films scored by Samuel Kaylin
1930s English-language films
1930s American films